The 2011 Malaysian motorcycle Grand Prix was the seventeenth round of the 2011 Grand Prix motorcycle racing season. It took place on the weekend of 21–23 October 2011 at the Sepang International Circuit, but the MotoGP race was red-flagged and subsequently cancelled after two laps due to a serious accident involving Marco Simoncelli. Simoncelli fell while running fourth, his bike and body veering across the path of Colin Edwards and Valentino Rossi. Simoncelli was fatally struck in the head and chest by the two bikes. He was taken straight to the circuit's medical centre, but died of his injuries shortly thereafter.

MotoGP classification
The race was stopped after two laps due to an accident involving Marco Simoncelli, who later died; the race was subsequently cancelled. Prior to the accident there had been a 1-2-3 Repsol Honda front row of the grid, where Casey Stoner took the start and led from Dani Pedrosa and Andrea Dovizioso. Since the race was cancelled rather than abandoned after just one full lap was completed, however, no Grand Prix winner was declared and no points were awarded.

Moto2 classification
The race was stopped after 17 laps due to an accident involving Axel Pons.

125 cc classification

Notes

References

Malaysian motorcycle Grand Prix
Malaysia
Motorcycle Grand Prix
Malaysian motorcycle Grand Prix
Malaysian motorcycle Grand Prix
Motorcycle racing controversies